Knife Tree is a public art work by German artist Heinz Mack located at the Lynden Sculpture Garden near Milwaukee, Wisconsin. The sculpture is an abstract spire with upper elements resembling a feather. It is made of steel plated with chrome; it is installed on the lawn.

References

Outdoor sculptures in Milwaukee
1966 sculptures
Steel sculptures in Wisconsin
Abstract sculptures in Wisconsin
1966 establishments in Wisconsin